Franca Audu (born 14 February 1991) is a Nigerian judoka who competed in the women's U48kg and U52kg category. She won a bronze medal at the 2010 African Judo Championships and 2 bronze medals at the All-Africa Games in 2011 and 2015.

Sports career 
In 2010, she participated in the African Judo Championships held in Yaoundé, Tunisia, Audu won a gold medal in the women's 48 kg.

Franca Audu won a bronze medal in the 48 kg event at the Africa Games held in Maputo, Mozambique in 2011. Also at the same competition in 2015 which was held in Brazzaville, Republic of the Congo, she won another bronze medal.

See also 
Judo at the 2011 All-Africa Games

References

External links
 

Nigerian female judoka
1991 births
Living people
African Games medalists in judo
African Games bronze medalists for Nigeria
Competitors at the 2011 All-Africa Games
Competitors at the 2015 African Games
20th-century Nigerian women
21st-century Nigerian women